The 2007 season is the 85th season of competitive football in Ecuador.

National leagues

Serie A

Champion: LDU Quito (9th title)
Runner-up: Deportivo Cuenca
International qualifiers:
2008 Copa Libertadores: LDU Quito, Deportivo Cuenca, El Nacional
2007 Copa Sudamericana: Olmedo
2008 Copa Sudamericana: LDU Quito
Relegated: Imbabura

Serie B
Winner: Universidad Católica
Runner-up: ESPOLI
Promoted: Universidad Católica, ESPOLI, Técnico Universitario
Relegated: Delfín

Segunda
Winner: Independiente José Terán
Runner-up: Grecia
Promoted: Independiente José Terán, Grecia, LDU Cuenca

Clubs in international competitions

National team

Senior team
Luis Fernando Suárez resigned as the head coach of the senior team. He was replaced by Sixto Vizuete, who was previously the coach of the U-20 team.

Friendlies

Copa América
Ecuador participated in their 24th Copa América. They were drawn into Group B and finished last in the group.

World Cup qualifying
CONMEBOL's qualification for the 2010 FIFA World Cup started in 2007.

External links
Official website of the Ecuadorian football federation  
2007 season on RSSSF

 
Seasons in Ecuadorian football